Michelle Berube is an American actress and retired Olympic gymnast.

Rhythmic gymnastics champion
Berube was inducted into the USA Gymnastics Hall of Fame in 2004. She competed at the 1984 Olympic Games and 1988 Olympic Games, finishing in 14th and 22nd place respectively.

Filmography

References

American film actresses
People from Rochester Hills, Michigan
Actresses from Michigan
1966 births
Living people
Gymnasts at the 1984 Summer Olympics
Gymnasts at the 1988 Summer Olympics
20th-century American actresses
American rhythmic gymnasts
Olympic gymnasts of the United States
21st-century American women